Rainy Day is an album by jazz trombonist and arranger Kai Winding featuring vocal group, The Prevailing Winds, recorded in late 1964 and early 1965 for the Verve label.

Reception

The Allmusic review by Tony Wilds said "Whether Rainy Day is best saved for one remains in doubt, but at least the concept balances the many mod albums selling nothing but "Madison Avenue"'s sweetness-and-light".

Track listing
 "Half a Crown" (Bobby Scott, Joseph Scott) - 2:19
 "We Fell in Love in the Rain" (Kai Winding) - 2:30
 "April Showers" (Louis Silvers, B. G. De Sylva) - 2:33
 "Leave Me Alone" (Winding, Jerry Keller) - 2:34
 "Love Theme from the Motion Picture "Umbrellas of Cherbourg" (I Will Wait for You)" (Michel Legrand, Norman Gimbel) - 2:00
 "Here's That Rainy Day" (Jimmy Van Heusen, Johnny Burke) - 2:25
 "Singin' in the Rain" (Arthur Freed, Nacio Herb Brown) - 1:50
 "Over the Rainbow" (Harold Arlen, Yip Harburg) - 2:00
 "Pennies from Heaven" (Arthur Johnston, Burke) - 4:15
 "Puddles" (Winding) - 2:10
 "Dinner For One Please, James" (Michael Carr) - 3:02
 "Watermelon Man" (Herbie Hancock) - 2:53

Personnel 
Kai Winding - trombone, arranger
Tony Studd, Bill Watrous - trombone
Roger Kellaway - piano, organ
Arthur Butler - organ
Paul Griffin, Ross Tompkins - piano
Everett Barksdale, Kenny Burrell, Billy Mure, Bucky Pizzarelli - guitar
Russell George - bass, guitar
Bob Bushnell - electric bass
Sol Gubin, Al Harewood, Grady Tate - drums
The Prevailing Winds - vocal group directed by Jerry Keller (tracks 1, 2, 4 & 6-8)

References 

1965 albums
Verve Records albums
Kai Winding albums
Albums produced by Creed Taylor